Senise is a town in the province of Potenza, Basilicata, southern Italy. It is near Monte Cotugno Lake, one of the largest artificial basins in Europe.

Twin towns
 Busto Garolfo, Italy

References

External links
[www.comune.senise.pz.it Official website] 

Cities and towns in Basilicata